Laurier–Waterloo Park is a stop on the Region of Waterloo's Ion rapid transit system. It is located on Seagram Drive at the Waterloo Spur rail corridor, just inside Waterloo Park.

Access to the platform is from both ends: from the north, directly from the Seagram Drive sidewalk; to the south, access to paths within the Park are available on either side of the tracks.

The station's feature wall consists of brown stone tiles with vertical striations.

The southbound track is also used by freight trains on the Waterloo Spur line, which serves industrial locations in Elmira. These trains only run in the overnight hours after LRT service has halted. To protect the station structure (and the trains themselves), a gauntlet track is in place alongside this station that offsets the freight track a small distance.

In addition to the park, nearby locations include University Stadium and the University of Waterloo's UW Place residences.

References

External links

 

Ion light rail stations
Railway stations in Canada at university and college campuses
Railway stations in Waterloo, Ontario
2019 establishments in Ontario